The 1932 Colorado Agricultural Aggies football team represented Colorado Agricultural College (now known as Colorado State University) in the Rocky Mountain Conference (RMC) during the 1932 college football season.  In their 23rd season under head coach Harry W. Hughes, the Aggies compiled a 4–3–1 record, finished sixth in the RMC, and outscored opponents by a total of 100 to 45.

Schedule

References

Colorado Agricultural
Colorado State Rams football seasons
Colorado Agricultural Aggies football